Kansikas is a surname. Notable people with the surname include:

Tuomas Kansikas (born 1981), Finnish footballer
Veikko Kansikas (1923-1991), Finnish politician

Finnish-language surnames